The South Madrid derby, is the name given to any association football match contested between Getafe CF and CD Leganés, the two biggest teams in the south of the Community of Madrid.

History

Getafe and Leganés are two of the biggest cities in the south of the Community of Madrid and developed since the 1920s a strong rivalry, that started when both teams played in the regional leagues and Getafe's team was Getafe Deportivo.

Despite surely coincided in the 1920s and in the 1930s, the first registered official match was played on 25 April 1948, in the final of the Segunda Regional Ordinaria (seventh tier), and Getafe Deportivo defeated Leganés by 1-4.

The rivalry became stronger in the 1980s and in the 1990s, now with Getafe CF founded after the dissolution of Getafe Deportivo. Both teams played together in Segunda División B and Segunda División, leaving the derbies from Tercera División to the Regional leagues in the past.

In 2017, both Getafe and Leganés met for the first time ever in La Liga, reviving the rivalry and becoming the first derby in Spanish football history that had been played in every division of Spanish football.

Head-to-head statistics
This table only includes matches between CD Leganés and Getafe CF, founded in 1983.

All-time results

La Liga

References

Football rivalries in Spain
CD Leganés
Getafe CF
Football in the Community of Madrid
Recurring sporting events established in 1948